Red Album is the debut studio album released by American progressive metal band Baroness.

Background
Red Album was named Album of the Year by heavy metal magazine Revolver.

The music video for "Wanderlust" debuted on December 8, 2007 on Headbangers Ball.

In 2017, Rolling Stone ranked Red Album as 83rd on their list of 'The 100 Greatest Metal Albums of All Time.'

It is their only album to feature Brian Blickle on guitar.

Track listing

Notes
 "Untitled" starts with 11:01 of silence. Only the last 1:10 make up the actual song.

Personnel
 John Dyer Baizley – vocals, rhythm guitar, artwork
 Allen Blickle – drums
 Brian Blickle – lead guitar
 Summer Welch – bass

References

External links
Vinyl Pressing Info and Pictures

Baroness (band) albums
2007 debut albums
Relapse Records albums
Albums with cover art by John Dyer Baizley